Idli or idly is a type of savoury rice cake, originating from South India, popular as a breakfast food in Southern India and in Sri Lanka. The cakes are made by steaming a batter consisting of fermented black lentils (de-husked) and rice. The fermentation process breaks down the starches so that they are more readily metabolised by the body.

Idli has several variations, including rava idli, which is made from semolina. Regional variants include sanna of Konkan.

History
A precursor of the modern idli is mentioned in several ancient Indian works. Vaddaradhane, a 920 CE Kannada language work by Shivakotiacharya mentions "iddalige", prepared only from a black gram batter. Chavundaraya II, the author of the earliest available Kannada encyclopedia, Lokopakara (1025 CE), describes the preparation of this food by soaking black gram in buttermilk, ground to a fine paste, and mixed with the clear water of curd and spices. The Western Chalukya king and scholar Someshwara III, reigning in the area now called Karnataka, included an idli recipe in his encyclopedia, Manasollasa (1130 CE). This Sanskrit-language work describes the food as iḍḍarikā. In Karnataka, the Idli in 1235 CE is described as being "light, like coins of high value", which is not suggestive of a rice base. The food prepared using this recipe is now called uddina idli in Karnataka.

The recipe mentioned in these ancient Indian works leaves out three key aspects of the modern idli recipe: the use of rice (not just black gram), the long fermentation of the mix, and the steaming for fluffiness. The references to the modern recipe appear in the Indian works only after 1250 CE. Food historian K. T. Achaya speculates that the modern idli recipe might have originated in present-day Indonesia, which has a long tradition of fermented food. According to him, the cooks employed by the Hindu kings of the Indianised kingdoms might have invented the steamed idli there, and brought the recipe back to India during 800–1200 CE. Achaya mentioned an Indonesian dish called "kedli", which according to him, was like an idli. However, Janaki Lenin was unable to find any recipe for an Indonesian dish by this name. According to food historian Colleen Taylor Sen the fermentation process of idli batter is natural process that was discovered independently in India, since nearly all cultures use fermentation in some form. 

Gujarati historians believe that it was Saurashtrian textile merchants who introduced idli to South India during the 10th and 12th centuries. There are even claims that a mix of rice and black gram ground together and later steamed to form cakes had its origins in Gujarat. The Gujarati work Varṇaka Samuccaya (1520 CE) mentions idli as idari, and also mentions its local adaption idada (a non-fermented version of dhokla).

The earliest extant Tamil work to mention idli (as itali) is Maccapuranam, dated to the 17th century. In 2015, Chennai-based Idli caterer Eniyavan started celebrating 30 March as the "World Idli Day".

Preparation

To make Idli, four parts uncooked rice (idli rice or parboiled rice) to one part whole white lentil (black gram, Vigna mungo) are soaked separately for at least four hours to six hours or overnight. Optionally spices such as fenugreek seeds can be added at the time of soaking for additional flavour. Once done soaking, the lentils are ground to a fine paste and the rice is separately coarsely ground, then they are combined. Next, the mixture is left to ferment overnight during which its volume will more than double. After fermentation some of the batter may be kept as a starter culture for the next batch. The finished idli batter is put into greased moulds of an idli tray or "tree" for steaming. The perforated molds allow the idlis to be cooked evenly. The tree holds the trays above the level of boiling water in a pot, and the pot is covered until the idlis are done (about 10–25 minutes, depending on size). A more traditional method is to use leaves instead of moulds.

Serving
Since plain idlis are mild in taste, a condiment is considered essential. Idlis are often served with chutneys (coconut based), sambar and Medu vada. However, this varies greatly by region and personal taste, it is also often served with kaara chutney (onion based) or spicy fish curries. The dry spice mixture podi  is convenient while travelling.

Variations
There are several regional variations of idlis made in South India and Sri Lanka. With the emigration of south Indians and Sri Lankans throughout the region and world, many variations on idli have been created in addition to the almost countless local variations. Hard-to-get ingredients and differing cooking customs have required changes in both ingredients and  methods. Parboiled rice can reduce the soaking time considerably. Store-bought ground rice or cream of rice may also be used. Similarly, semolina or cream of wheat may be used for preparing rava idli (wheat idli). Dahi (yogurt) may be added to provide the sour flavour for unfermented batters. Pre-packaged mixes allow for almost instant idlis.

In addition to or instead of fenugreek other spices may be used such as mustard seeds, chili peppers, cumin, coriander, ginger, etc.  Sugar may be added to make them sweet instead of savoury.  Idli may also be stuffed with a filling of potato, beans, carrot and masala. Leftover idlis can be cut-up or crushed and sautéed for a dish called idli upma.  A microwave or an automatic electric steamer that is non-stick is considered to be a convenient alternative to conventional stovetop steamers. Batter preparation using a manual rocking rock grinder can be replaced by electric grinders or blenders. Many restaurants have also come up with fusion recipes of Idlis as idly manchurian, idly fry, chilly idly, stuffed idly, to name a few.

Batter fermentation mechanism
Fermentation of idli batter results in both leavening caused by the generation of carbon dioxide as well as an increase in acidity. This fermentation is performed by lactic acid bacteria especially the heterofermentative strain Leuconostoc mesenteroides and the homofermantative strain Enterococcus faecalis (formerly classified as Streptococcus faecalis). Heterofermantative lactic acid bacteria such as L. mesenteroides generate both lactic acid as well as carbon dioxide whereas homofermantative lactic acid bacteria only generate lactic acid.

Both L. mesenteroides and E. faecalis are predominantly delivered to the batter by the black gram. Both strains start multiplying while the grains are soaking and continue to do so after grinding.

L. mesenteroides tolerates high concentrations of salt unlike most other bacteria. Hence the salt in the batter and the ongoing generation of lactic acid both suppress the growth of other undesirable micro-organisms.

Idli Day
March 30 is celebrated as World Idli Day. It was first celebrated in 2015 at Chennai.

See also

 Bhapa pitha
 Cuisine of Karnataka
 Dhokla
 List of Indian breads
 List of steamed foods
 Puttu
 Rava idli
 Sanna

References

Bibliography
 
 Devi, Yamuna (1987). Lord Krishna's Cuisine: The Art of Indian Vegetarian Cooking, Dutton. .
 
 Jaffrey, Madhur (1988). A Taste of India, Atheneum. 
 Rau, Santha Rama (1969). The Cooking of India, Time-Life Books.

Indian breads
Indian rice dishes
Fermented foods
Andhra cuisine
Karnataka cuisine
Kerala cuisine
South Indian cuisine
Steamed foods
Tamil cuisine
Telangana cuisine
Malaysian breads
Sri Lankan rice dishes